Christopher Richard Serle (born 13 July 1943 in Bristol, England) is a former BBC TV presenter, reporter and actor.

Biography
Serle was educated at Clifton College and Trinity College, Dublin, where he studied modern languages.  He appeared as a foil for Irish comedian Dave Allen in his series Dave Allen at Large in 1971, but gained greater UK public recognition as one of the presenters on the TV series That's Life!. He later presented and appeared in In at the Deep End, a series in which he, and fellow former That's Life! presenter Paul Heiney, were pitched into professional situations with no prior knowledge.

In the 1980s, he presented Windmill in which clips from the BBC archives on particular themes were shown (so called as the then base for BBC archives was in Windmill Road, Brentford). He also presented the viewer-response show Points of View, The Computer Programme, and Monkey Business. On radio, he was the regular host of Pick of the Week between 1991 and 1998, and a frequent guest presenter until 2006. He also was the interviewer and host of the BBC series Greek Language and People with Katia Dandoulaki.  As of 2005, he serves as the honorary president of the Bristol Hospital Broadcasting Service, a registered charity which provides a radio service to the hospitals of Bristol.

Serle featured on an episode of the BBC game show, The Adventure Game, with Sandra Dickinson and Adam Tandy on 16 February 1984. He also presented BBC's Radio Bristol The Afternoon Show for several years.

Personal life
He is president of the Atwell-Wilson Motor Museum.

References

External links
 Chris Serle, Esq's Biography. Debrett's. Retrieved 2011-03-10.
 Meet our Presenters: Chris Serle. Travel Channel. Retrieved 2011-03-10.

1943 births
Living people
British television presenters
Television personalities from Bristol
People educated at Clifton College
Alumni of Trinity College Dublin